The Castro District, commonly referred to as the Castro, is a neighborhood in Eureka Valley in San Francisco. The Castro was one of the first gay neighborhoods in the United States. Having transformed from a working-class neighborhood through the 1960s and 1970s, the Castro remains one of the most prominent symbols of lesbian, gay, bisexual, and transgender (LGBT) activism and events in the world.

Location

San Francisco's gay village is mostly concentrated in the business district that is located on Castro Street from Market Street to 19th Street. It extends down Market Street toward Church Street and on both sides of the Castro neighborhood from Church Street to Eureka Street. Although the greater gay community was, and is, concentrated in the Castro, many gay people live in the surrounding residential areas bordered by Corona Heights, the Mission District, Noe Valley, Twin Peaks, and Haight-Ashbury neighborhoods. Some consider it to include Duboce Triangle and Dolores Heights, which both have a strong LGBT presence.

Castro Street, which originates a few blocks north at the intersection of Divisadero and Waller Streets, runs south through Noe Valley, crossing the 24th Street business district and ending as a continuous street a few blocks farther south as it moves toward the Glen Park neighborhood. It reappears in several discontinuous sections before ultimately terminating at Chenery Street, in the heart of Glen Park.

History

Castro Street was named after José Castro (1808–1860), a Californian leader of Mexican opposition to U.S. rule in California in the 19th century, and alcalde of Alta California from 1835 to 1836. The neighborhood known as the Castro, in the district of Eureka Valley, was created in 1887 when the Market Street Railway Company built a line linking Eureka Valley to downtown.

In 1891, Alfred E. Clarke built his mansion at the corner of Douglass and Caselli Avenue at 250 Douglass which is commonly referenced as the Caselli Mansion. It survived the 1906 earthquake and fire which destroyed a large portion of San Francisco.

Early years

Up to the 19th century, the areal possession of the Russian Empire in North America included the modern-day U.S. state of Alaska and settlements in the modern-day U.S. states of California (1 settlement) and Hawaii (3 settlements, starting in 1817). These Russian possessions were collectively and officially referred to by the name Russian America from 1733 to 1867. Formal incorporation of the possessions by Russia did not take place until the establishment of the Russian-American Company (RAC) in 1799.

In 1809–1917, Finland was an autonomous part of the Russian Empire and was officially referred to as the Grand Duchy of Finland. During this era, the operations of both merchant and naval fleets as well as construction of naval vessels, relied heavily on Finnish know-how, seamen and officers. At the time, Russia was a relatively young naval power, gaining gradually access to the Baltic Sea only after the city of Saint Petersburg was founded on its coast in 1703, becoming officially part of Russia only at the end of the Great Northern War (1700–1721) in 1721.

In 1839, Sitka Lutheran Church, the first Protestant congregation on the west coast of the Americas and the first Lutheran congregation on the entire Pacific Rim was founded in Sitka, Alaska, by Finns who worked for the Russian-American Company. From the start, in 1840–1865, three consecutive Finnish pastors served this pastorate: Uno Cygnaeus (1840–1845), Gabriel Plathan (1845–1852) and Georg Gustaf Winter (1852–1865). The Finns Aaron Sjöstrom and Otto Reinhold Rehn served as the parish organists/sextons during this period.

In 1841, under the governorship of Russian America by Finnish Arvid Adolf Etholén (1840–1845) (promoted to rear admiral in 1847), the Russian-American area of Fort Ross in Bodega Bay, California, was sold to Johann Sutter. On January 24, 1848, the first California gold was discovered on Sutter's land in Coloma, California, leading to the California Gold Rush, after news of this were spread abroad, mainly by the Finnish seamen in the service of the Russian-American Company.

During the final three decades of the existence of Russian America, Finnish Chief Managers ("governors") of Russian America included Arvid Adolf Etholén (a.k.a. Etolin) in 1840–1845 and Johan Hampus Furuhjelm in 1859–1864. A third Finn, Johan Joachim von Bartram, declined the offer for the five-year term between 1850 and 1855. All three were high ranking Imperial naval officers. In reference to San Francisco, researcher Maria J. Enckell states the following about the Finns in the Russian-American Company:
Russia relied heavily on Finnish seamen. These seamen manned Russian naval ships as well as its deep-sea-going vessels. Company records show that in the early 1800s these ships were crewed predominantly by merchant seamen from Finland. From 1840 onward the Company's around-the-world ships were manned entirely by Finnish merchant skippers and crews. Most Company ships stationed in Sitka and the Northern Pacific were likewise manned by Finnish skippers and Finnish crews.
… Significant too is that from the early 1800s the Finnish seamen sailing these ships had journeyed up and down the North and South American coasts. Salt, used by the Company in preserving pelts, was obtained on islands in Baja California. Fort Ross in Bodega Bay, just north of San Francisco, was a stop on that route until 1841 when the fort was sold to the "swindler" Johann Sutter, on whose land the first California Gold was found. Thus, all Finnish seamen plying these waters knew every nook and cranny on these shores. Similarly they knew equally well the coast on the Asiatic side. Returning to Finland on their mandatory around-the-world journeys, they spread the news of the riches they had seen.

San Francisco's harbor records and the Russian Consular records display the names of many Finnish and Baltic Russian Alaska skippers busily plying the waters between San Francisco, Petropavlovsk, Nikolajefsk and Vladivostok ... Long before the turn of the century 11% of San Francisco's seaman community were Finns. The commercial activities of these former Finnish Russian-American Company skippers and their men were impressive. At least two are known to have become multimillionaires: Gustaf Nybom (later Niebaum), the founder of Inglenook wineries, and Otto Wilhelm Lindholm of Vladivostok. Their business ventures had interests spread across the Northern Pacific. This activity continued until 1922 and the Soviet terror, when Vladivostok's numerous Finns and Manchurians were rounded up, marched to the central square and shot.

Late 19th century

During the California Gold Rush and in its aftermath, a substantial Finnish population had settled in San Francisco. In addition to Etholén, Furuhjelm and Niebaum, a number of Finns had become household names in the social circles of San Francisco by the time when the Finnish corvette Kalevala anchored in San Francisco on November 14, 1861. Accordingly, the ship's visit in the city received a very warm welcome and created much attention.

In 1863, a six-vessel Russian Imperial Navy squadron, a part of the Russian Pacific Fleet, sailed via Vladivostok to the West Coast of the United States, to help defend the waters there against a possible attack by the United Kingdom or France, during the American Civil War (April 12, 1861 – May 10, 1865). In addition to the Finnish-built corvette Kalevala now returning to the U.S. West Coast, this squadron included three other corvettes, Bogatyr, Rynda and Novik (Russian: "Новик"), as well as two Finnish-built clippers, the sister-ships Abrek (Russian: "Абрек") and Vsadnik (Russian: "Всадник"), both built in the southwestern Finnish town of Pori and launched in 1860. Finnish officers serving in the squadron included Theodor Kristian Avellan, who later became the Minister of Naval Affairs of the Russian Empire (similar role to Great Britain's First Lord of the Admiralty). Among Finnish officers participating in the expedition were also Mr. Enqvist and Mr. Etholén (not Governor Etholén of Russian America).

At the time when Finnish Sea Captain Gustave Niebaum, the founder of Inglenook Winery (1879) in Rutherford, California, was busy conducting business in the San Francisco Bay Area and Alaska – from the late 19th to the early 20th century –, both places had considerably large Finnish settlements. As the Governor of Russian America from 1858 to 1864, Finnish Johan Hampus Furuhjelm helped pave way for the American Alaska purchase, just like Gustave Niebaum did as the Consul of Russia for the United States in San Francisco in 1867 (at the time Finland was an autonomous Grand Duchy of Russia), when Alaska became part of the United States of America.

During his governorship of Russian America, Furuhjelm put an end to the hostilities involving groups of the native peoples of Alaska, and he succeeded in abolishing the Alaskan Ice Treaty with San Francisco. According to a contract which had been signed, Russian America had to deliver a certain amount of ice to San Francisco at a fixed price. The problem was that the product melted down on the way to the warmer climates. The ice contract became very awkward for the Russian colony. Furuhjelm arranged for a new contract to sell ice to San Francisco: 3,000 tons at $25.00 a ton.

Officially registered Finnish Club No. 1 was established in the Castro District of San Francisco in 1882. Soon after, two "Finnish Halls" were erected nearby. One was located at the corner of 24th Street and Hoffman Street. The other hall was located on Flint Street, on the "Rocky Hill" above Castro, an area densely populated by Finns at the time, consequently nicknamed Finn Town.

In 1899, the First Finnish Lutheran Church was founded on 50 Belcher Street, in what then was considered part of the Eureka Valley district of San Francisco, but what is located on the outskirts of what today is best known as the Castro District. Next to it, on September 17, 1905, the cornerstone was laid for the Danish St. Ansgar Church at 152 Church Street, between Market Street and Duboce Avenue. During the April 18, 1906, San Francisco earthquake and its aftermath, the parsonage served as a feeding station and hospital. In 1964, St. Ansgar merged with First Finnish Lutheran Church. The name for the united church, St. Francis Lutheran Church, was derived from San Francisco.

Before the 1906 San Francisco earthquake, nearly all the kids attending the McKinley school (now McKinley Elementary School) at 1025 14th Street (at Castro) were Finnish. Following the earthquake, a large number of Finns from San Francisco and elsewhere moved to Berkeley, where a Finnish community had been established already before the earthquake. A large part of the early Berkeley population was Finnish. The brick and wood frame of the St. Francis Lutheran Church building survived the 1906 San Francisco earthquake and then was used for several months as an infirmary. Following the earthquake, the same year, Finns founded the Lutheran Church of the Cross in Berkeley, at University Avenue, where the Lutheran congregation still operates today.

In c. 1910, a bathhouse called Finnila's Finnish Baths began serving customers in the Castro District, at 9 Douglass Street. Its opening as an official business serving the general public took place in 1913. In 1919, the business moved to 4032 17th Street, a half block west from the busy Castro Street. In 1932, the business moved again, now to 2284 Market Street. In 1986, after having been stationed in the Castro District for over seven decades, the business moved the final time, now to 465 Taraval Street in the San Francisco's Sunset District, where it continued as Finnila's Health Club, serving women only. Despite public outcry and attempts to prevent the closing of the popular Finnila's Market Street bathhouse, the old bathhouse building was demolished by Alfred Finnila soon after the farewell party held in the end of December 1985. Today, the Finnila family owns the new Market & Noe Center building at the location of the old bathhouse, in the corner of Market and Noe Streets.

Change of character
From 1910 on, the Castro District of San Francisco and some of the surrounding areas were known by the term Little Scandinavia, because of the large number of the residents in the area originating from Finnish, Danish, Norwegian and Swedish ancestry.

The 1943 novel Mama's Bank Account by Kathryn Forbes focused on a Norwegian family living in the area in the 1910s. Forbes' book served as the inspiration for John Van Druten's 1944 play I Remember Mama. The play was adapted to a Broadway theater production in 1944; to a movie in 1948; to a one-hour Lux Radio Theatre presentation on August 30, 1948; to a CBS Mama television series running from 1949 until 1957; and to a Broadway musical in 1979. Mama's Bank Account reflected a (then) Eureka Valley neighborhood, where for generations Norwegians worshiped at the Norwegian Lutheran Church at 19th and Dolores streets, and met for fraternal, social events, and Saturday night dances at Dovre Hall, 3543 18th Street, now the Women's Building.

The Cove on Castro used to be called The Norse Cove at the time. The Scandinavian Seamen's Mission operated for a long time on 15th Street, off Market Street, just around the corner from the Swedish-American Hall, which remains in the district. In the 1920s – during prohibition – the downstairs of the Swedish-American Hall served as a speak-easy, one of many in the area. "Unlicensed saloons" were known as speak-easies, according to an 1889 newspaper. They were "so called because of the practice of speaking quietly about such a place in public, or when inside it, so as not to alert the police or neighbors".

Scandinavian-style "half-timber" construction can still be seen in some of the buildings along Market Street, between Castro and Church Streets. A restaurant called Scandinavian Deli operated for decades on Market Street, between Noe and Sanchez Streets, almost directly across the street from Finnila's.

Receiving an influx of Irish, Italian and other immigrants in the 1930s, the Castro gradually became an ethnically mixed working-class neighborhood, and it remained so until the mid-1960s. There was originally a cable car line with large double-ended cable cars that ran along Castro Street from Market Street to 29th St., until the tracks were dismantled in 1941 and the cable car line was replaced by the 24 MUNI bus. The Castro is at the end of the straight portion of the Market Street thoroughfare, and a mostly residential area follows Market Street as it curves and rises up and around the Twin Peaks mountains.

LGBT community

The U.S. military discharged thousands of gay servicemen from the Pacific theatre in San Francisco during World War II (early 1940s) because of their sexuality. Many settled in the Bay Area, San Francisco and Sausalito. In San Francisco, an established gay community had begun in numerous areas including Polk Street (which used to be regarded as the city's gay center from the 1950s to the early 1980s), the Tenderloin and South of Market. The 1950s saw large numbers of families moving out of the Castro to the suburbs in what became known as the "White flight", leaving open large amounts of real estate and creating attractive locations for gay purchasers. The Missouri Mule first opened in 1935 by Norwegian Immigrant Hans K Lund and would find its place in San Francisco's history becoming a proud icon of the LBGTQ community following its reopening in 1963.

The Castro's age as a gay mecca began during the late 1960s with the Summer of Love in the neighboring Haight-Ashbury district in 1967. The two neighborhoods are separated by a steep hill, topped by Buena Vista Park. The hippie and free love movements had fostered communal living and free society ideas including the housing of large groups of people in hippie communes. Androgyny became popular with men even in full beards as gay hippie men began to move into the area. The 1967 gathering brought tens of thousands of middle-class youth from all over the United States to the Haight which saw its own exodus when well-organized individuals and collectives started to see the Castro as an oasis from the massive influx. Many of the hippies had no way to support themselves or places to shelter. The Haight became drug-ridden and violent, chasing off the gay population, who looked for a more stable area to live.

The gay community created an upscale, fashionable urban center in the Castro District in the 1970s. Many San Francisco gays also moved there in the years around 1970 from what was then the most prominent gay neighborhood, Polk Gulch, because large Victorian houses were available at low rents or available for purchase for low down payments when their former middle-class owners had fled to the suburbs.

By 1973, Harvey Milk, who would become the most famous resident of the neighborhood, opened a camera store, Castro Camera, and began political involvement as a gay activist, further contributing to the notion of the Castro as a gay destination. Some of the culture of the late 1970s included what was termed the "Castro clone", a mode of dress and personal grooming that exemplified butchness and masculinity of the working-class men in construction—tight denim jeans, black or sand combat boots, tight T-shirt or, often, an Izod crocodile shirt, possibly a red plaid flannel outer shirt, and usually sporting a mustache or full beard—in vogue with the gay male population at the time, and which gave rise to the nickname "Clone Canyon" for the stretch of Castro Street between 18th and Market Streets.

There were numerous famous watering holes in the area contributing to the nightlife, including the Corner Grocery Bar, Toad Hall, the Pendulum, the Midnight Sun, Twin Peaks, and the Elephant Walk. A typical daytime street scene of the period is perhaps best illustrated by mentioning the male belly dancers who could be found holding forth in good weather at the corner of 18th and Castro on "Hibernia Beach", in front of the financial institution from which it drew its name. Then at night, after the bars closed at 2 AM, the men remaining at that hour often would line up along the sidewalk of 18th Street to indicate that they were still available to go home with someone (aka The Meat Rack).

The area was heavily impacted by the HIV/AIDS crisis of the 1980s. Beginning in 1984, city officials began a crackdown on bathhouses and launched initiatives that aimed to prevent the spread of AIDS. Kiosks lining Market Street and Castro Street now have posters promoting safe sex and testing right alongside those advertising online dating services.

In 2019, San Francisco Board of Supervisors member Rafael Mandelman authored an ordinance to create the Castro LGBTQ Cultural District; the ordinance was passed unanimously.

Attractions

One of the more notable features of the neighborhood is Castro Theatre, a movie palace built in 1922 and one of San Francisco's premier movie houses.

18th and Castro is a major intersection in the Castro, where many historic events, marches, and protests have taken and continue to take place.

A major cultural destination in the neighborhood is the GLBT History Museum, which opened for previews on December 10, 2010, at 4127 18th St. The grand opening of the museum took place on the evening of January 13, 2011. The first full-scale, stand-alone museum of lesbian, gay, bisexual and transgender history in the United States (and only the second in the world after the Schwules Museum in Berlin), the GLBT History Museum is a project of the GLBT Historical Society.

The F Market heritage streetcar line turnaround at Market and 17th-streets where the Jane Warner city parklet sits. Across Castro street is the Harvey Milk Plaza in honor of its most famous resident with its iconic giant flag pole with an oversized rainbow flag, symbol of the LGBT community. Below street level is the main entrance to the Castro Street Station, a Muni Metro subway station and a multitiered park. Milk's camera store and campaign headquarters which were at 575 Castro has a memorial plaque and mural on the inside of the store, formerly housing the Human Rights Campaign Action Center and Store, it now houses an LGBTQ+ arts store. There is a smaller mural above the sidewalk on the building showing Milk looking down on the street fondly.

Across Market Street from Harvey Milk Plaza, and slightly up the hill, is the Pink Triangle Park – 17th Street at Market, a city park and monument named after the pink triangles forcibly worn by gay prisoners persecuted by the Nazis during World War II.

Harvey's was formerly the Elephant Walk, raided by police after the White Night Riots.

Twin Peaks Tavern, the first gay bar in the city, and possibly in the United States, with plate glass windows to fully visibly expose patrons to the public, is located at the intersection of Market and Castro.

The Hartford Street Zen Center is also located in the Castro, as well as the
Most Holy Redeemer Catholic Church, 100 Diamond Street.

Special events, parades and street fairs that are held in the Castro include the Castro Street Fair, the Dyke March, the famed Halloween in the Castro (which was discontinued in 2007 due to street violence), Pink Saturday (discontinued in the Castro in 2016), and the San Francisco International LGBT Film Festival.

An LGBTQ Walk of Fame, the Rainbow Honor Walk, was installed in August 2014 with an inaugural twenty sidewalk bronze plaques representing past LGBTQ icons in their field who continue to serve as inspirations. The walk was originally planned to coincide with the business district of the Castro and eventually include 500 bronze plaques.

The main business section of Castro Street from Market to 19th Street was under reconstruction and repaving in 2014 to address a number of neighborhood concerns. The area has heavy vehicular traffic, as well as many visitors. As part of the work, the sidewalks were widened and new trees were planted. Additionally, 20 historical cement etchings covering from the inception to the area being settled to the 2010s sweeping gay marriage movement victories were installed in September 2014.

Castro Street History Walk
A separate sidewalk installation, the Castro Street History Walk (CSHW), is a series of twenty historical fact plaques about the neighborhood—ten from pre-1776 to the 1960s before the Castro became known as a gay neighborhood, and ten "significant events associated with the queer community in the Castro"—contained within the 400 and 500 blocks of the street between 19th and Market streets. They were installed at the same time as the inaugural twenty RHW plaques. The CSHW goes in chronological order starting at Harvey Milk Plaza at Market Street, up to 19th Street, and returning on the opposite side of Castro Street. The $10,000 CSHW was paid for by the Castro Business District (CBD) which "convened a group of local residents and historians to work with Nicholas Perry, a planner and urban designer at the San Francisco Planning Department who worked on the sidewalk-widening project and lives in the Castro" to develop the facts. Each fact was required to be about the neighborhood or the surrounding Eureka Valley. The facts are limited to 230 characters, and were installed in pairs along with a single graphic reminiscent of the historic Castro Theater.

CSHW facts
pre-1776, the native Yelamu, a tribelet of Ohlone people from the San Francisco Bay Area in Northern California. "The western people" was used by east bay Ohlone to describe the Ohlone people living on the San Francisco Peninsula.
1776: Juan Bautista de Anza ’s establishes Mission Dolores.
1846: The last Mexican Alcalde of Yerba Buena (San Francisco) is granted the area later named as Eureka Valley.
1854: John Horner buys some of the ranch.
1895: Transit improvements, including the Castro St. cable car, spur settlement by working class Irish, German, and Scandinavian families in the late 19th century.
1900: Most Holy Redeemer Church is founded
1907: Music/event venue Swedish American Hall opens.
1918: The Twin Peaks Tunnel is established linking the neighborhood with West Portal.
1922: Well-known local architect Timothy Pflueger‘s first-designed theater, the Castro Theatre, opens.
1935: Hans K Lund the original owner of the Missouri Mule opens for business. 
1943: Area resident Norwegian-American author Kathryn Forbes’s novel, Mama's Bank Account uses Castro Street as its setting.
1953: After 18 years in business Hans K. Lund and wife Margaret would sell the Missouri Mule to Berkeley police officer Wayne Knutila and Del Martin and Phyllis Lyon lesbian power-couple establish a Castro Street home.
1963: Marks the second sale of The Missouri Mule which would close its doors for just long enough to expand, rebrand and reopen its doors later that same year choosing to keep the bars original established name . AS the Castro's first "openly" gay bar. An influx of LGBTQ residents and businesses led by the neighborhood's first "openly" gay bar, The Missouri Mule, transform the area into the Castro we know today.
1972: Twin Peaks Tavern, the U.S.’s first gay bar to have open-glass windows, opens.
1978: The community mourns the Milk-Moscone assassinations by gathering by the thousands in the Castro for a candlelight march.
1979: White Night Riots take place May after Dan White is not convicted of first-degree murder for the Milk-Moscone assassinations.
1981: Community activist Bobbi Campbell aka Sister Florence Nightmare, flyers the pharmacy with an alert about "gay cancer".
1987: AIDS Memorial Quilt has its first home courtesy of activist Cleve Jones on Market Street.
1998: The Bay Area Reporter famously runs banner headline—"No Obits" after thousands of HIV/AIDS deaths.

LGBT tourism

San Francisco has a large and thriving tourist economy due to ethnic and cultural communities such as Chinatown, North Beach, Haight-Ashbury and the Castro. The Castro is a site of economic success that brings in capital all year round with many events catered to the gay community along with everyday business.

The Castro is a "thriving marketplace for all things gay" meaning the area caters to people who identify with LGBT culture and other associated meanings to the word gay. There are cafes, the Castro Theater, and many businesses that cater to or openly welcome LGBT consumers. These establishments make the Castro an area of high spending and lead to high tourist traffic. In addition to the city's locals, people travel to visit the shops and restaurants as well as the events that take place, such as the Castro Street Fair. Events such as the fair drum up business for the community and bring in people from all over the nation who visit solely for the atmosphere the Castro provides. People who do not necessarily feel comfortable expressing themselves in their own community have the freedom to travel to places such as the Castro to escape the alienation and feel accepted. There is a sense of belonging and acceptance that is promoted throughout the district to accommodate non-heteronormative people that many LGBT travelers are attracted to.

The Golden Gate Business Association (GGBA) was created in 1974 to help promote the Castro as a place for tourists, but also San Francisco and LGBT businesses as a whole. The GGBA sought to gain local political power and hoped to achieve their gains through an increase in gay tourism, and the association formed the San Francisco Gay Tourism and Visitor's Bureau in 1983. The LGBT tourism industry drives and benefits the economy due to the constant influx of consumers.

See also

LGBT culture in San Francisco
LGBT history in Chinatown, San Francisco

References

External links

Castro District Guide – Things To Do, Reviews and News
Castro Biscuit – The Castro Area Happenings Blog
Castro SF – The Complete Local Guide
Guided photo tour of Castro
Golden Gate Business Association
San Francisco Bay Times
Finnila's-related exerts from the novel The Contest, by Stevanne Auerbach, Ph.D.
"The Finnish migration to and from Russian Alaska and the Pacific Siberian Rim 1800–1900", M. J. Enckell. Article published in Siirtolaisuus – Migration, 4/2002. Pages 16–22. Turku, 2002.

 
Danish-American culture in California
Gay villages in California
Finnish-American culture in California
Irish-American culture in California
Italian-American culture in California
Neighborhoods in San Francisco
LGBT culture in San Francisco
Norwegian-American culture in California
Tourist attractions in San Francisco
Swedish-American culture in California
Working-class culture in California